Consinka Lake is a lake located on Vancouver Island is an expansion of Consinka Creek east  of San Mateo Bay.

See also
List of lakes of British Columbia

References

Alberni Valley
Lakes of Vancouver Island
Barclay Land District